Landstuhl is a town in Rhineland-Palatinate, Germany.

Landstuhl may also refer to:

Places 
 Landstuhl Air Base, former name of Ramstein Air Base
 Landstuhl Marsh, a region in West Palatinate
 Verbandsgemeinde Landstuhl, a municipal association in Rhineland-Palatinate, Germany

Other uses
 Landstuhl Elementary Middle School, a U.S. Department of Defense Dependents School
 Landstuhl Regional Medical Center, a U.S. Army post and hospital in western Germany
 Landstuhl station, a railway station in Landstuhl

See also 
 Landstuhl–Kusel railway, a railway line